Craugastor laevissimus is a species of frog in the family Craugastoridae. It is found in Honduras and Nicaragua. Its natural habitats are lowland and sub-montane wet and moist forests; it can survive in degraded forest and secondary growth. It occurs along streams and small rivers.

Craugastor laevissimus was previously a common frog but has then declined. The reasons for the decline are not fully understood; habitat loss, chytridiomycosis, and pollution are among the possible causes of decline.

References

laevissimus
Frogs of North America
Endangered fauna of North America
Amphibians of Honduras
Amphibians of Nicaragua
Amphibians described in 1896
Taxa named by Franz Werner
Taxonomy articles created by Polbot